Steve, Steven or Stephen Wood may refer to:

 Steve Wood (bishop) (born 1963), American first bishop of the Anglican Diocese of the Carolinas
 Steve Wood (footballer, born February 1963), English football player for Reading
 Steve Wood (footballer, born June 1963), English football player
 Steve Wood (tennis) (born 1962), Australian tennis player
 Steven Wood (1961–1995), Australian canoeist
 Stephen W. Wood (born 1948), Republican assemblyman from North Carolina
 Stephen Mosher Wood (1832–1920), Kansas politician
 Stephen Wood (ice hockey) (born 1981), American ice hockey coach and player
 Steven Wood, founder of Northern Cree Singers

See also
Steven Woods (disambiguation)